Pandit Vikash Maharaj (born 1 July 1957) is an Indian sarod player. In his childhood, he initially learnt to play the tabla and then discovered and studied the sarod as his preferred instrument.

Early life and background
Vikash was born in Varanasi in 1957 into a family of musicians(Banaras Gharana). He was instructed on the sarod by Rajesh Chandra Moitra of the school of Indian classical Maihar gharana. His formal schooling was complemented by lessons from his family including his uncle Kishan Maharaj.

Music 
Vikash performs Indian classical music, jazz and crossover between Indian music and Jazz. He tours and participates in international crossover festivals such as the WOMAD, the Diwali festival in New Zealand or the International Leprosy Eradication Festival. During his tours through California, Vikash Maharaj was accompanied by his son and tabla player Prabhash Maharaj.

Vikash has performed with musicians such as Prabhash Maharaj, Abhishek Maharaj, Joshua Geisler, Tom Bailey, Vishal Maharaj or the German a cappella group Wise Guys. 
On initiation by German music journalist and author Joachim-Ernst Berendt, Vikash participated in the crossover Jazz record "Raga" in 1996. The work was composed by Patrick Bebelaar, and participating musicians were Patrick Bebelaar, Frank Kroll, Prabhash Maharaj and Subhash Maharaj. In a second cooperation with Bebelaar, Vikash Maharaj and his son Prabhash contributed to the crossover album "Point of View". "Point of View" was a commissioned composition by the Internationale Bachakademie Stuttgart and premiered in Stuttgart in 2001.
He was awarded the Certificate of Honour (D.I.G. Germany) in 2016  and the Yash Bharti Award by the Uttar Pradesh Government in 2014

Discography 
 Music Ensemble of Benaras (LP) (1983)
 Music Ensemble of Benaras (CD) (1984)
 10 Years of Music Ensemble of Benaras (CD) (1989)
 Raga (CD) (1996)
 Best of Open Jazz Festival Stuttgart (DVD) (1998)
 Pandit Vikash Maharaj (DVD) (2009)
 Sapna (CD) (2001)
 Point Of View (CD) (2003)
 Vikash Maharaj (CD) (2006)
 Path (CD) (2009)
 Yaaraa (CD) (2010)
 Holiwater (CD) (2012)
 Maya(CD) (2014)
 Celebration (CD) (2015)
 Maharaj Trio (2018)

Social activism 

 Chairman "Bhagan Buddha Mahavidyalaya", Sarnath, Varanasi
 Former member of United Nations Youth Organization
 Former member of U.P. I.A.S. Association
 Holiwater Project

References

External links 

 Maharaj Trio Maharaj Trio 
 Holiwater Band (A Musical Group dedicated to protect Environment), INDIA/NEW ZEALAND
 Artists Against Child Labor, International
 indianweekender.co.nz
 Jazz Beacon Award Ceremony coverage by BeyondChron
 LA yoga sitting down with tradition
 http://www.varanasi.org.in/pandit-vikas-maharaj

Hindustani instrumentalists
Living people
Sarod players
Musicians from Varanasi
1957 births
20th-century Indian musicians
21st-century Indian musicians